Karka II (ruled 972–973 CE) succeeded his uncle Kottigga Amoghavarsha to the Rashtrakuta throne. By this time the once great Rashtrakuta empire was declining. His able feudatory, the Western Ganga King Marasimha II Satyavakya defeated the Pallavas. But the weaknesses created by the earlier plunder of Manyakheta by Paramara King Siyaka II exposed the Rashtrakutas to further depredation who did not survive for long. During this time of confusion, Chalukya Tailapa II declared independence and killed Karka II, capturing the Rashtrakuta capital Manyakheta.

Karka II was a son of Nirupama, a Rashtrakuta prince who was the younger brother of Khottiga, the Rashtrakuta monarch.

References

Bibilography

External links
 History of Karnataka, Mr. Arthikaje

973 deaths
Hindu monarchs
10th-century rulers in Asia
Rashtrakuta dynasty
Year of birth unknown